The AIC Serie A Female Footballer of the Year is a yearly award organized by the Italian Footballers' Association (AIC) given to the female footballer who has been considered to have performed the best over the previous women's football Serie A season.

The award is part of the Gran Galà del Calcio (formerly known as Oscar del Calcio) awards event.

Melania Gabbiadini has won the award a record four times, all consecutively.

Winners

By club

By country

By position

References

External links
List of winners on the Gran Galà del Calcio official website

Serie A (women's football)
Awards established in 2012
Lists of footballers in Italy
2012 establishments in Italy
Association football player non-biographical articles